Gliocephalotrichum is a genus of fungi belonging to the family Nectriaceae.

The genus was first described by J. J. Ellis and Clifford William Hesseltine in 1962.

The genus has cosmopolitan distribution.

Species:
 Gliocephalotrichum simplex (J.A.Mey.) B.J.Wiley & E.G.Simmons

References

Nectriaceae
Nectriaceae genera